Currajah is a rural locality in the Cassowary Coast Region, Queensland, Australia.

History 
The locality takes its name from a tramway station (later a railway station) and is an Aboriginal word meaning running water.

References 

Cassowary Coast Region
Localities in Queensland